P44 or P-44 may refer to:

Vessels 
 , a corvette of the Argentine Navy
 , a submarine of the Royal Navy
 , a corvette of the Indian Navy

Other uses 
 P44 (classification), a Modern pentathlon classification
 Feinwerkbau P44, a match pistol
 MAPK3, p44 mitogen-activated protein kinase
 P44 road (Ukraine)
 Papyrus 44, a biblical manuscript
 Phosphorus-44, an isotope of phosphorus
 Republic P-44 Rocket, a proposed American fighter aircraft
 P44, a Latvian state regional road